The 2012 Chicago White Sox season was the club's 113th season in Chicago and 112th in the American League. On October 6, 2011, Robin Ventura was designated to be the new manager.

Offseason
White Sox GM Kenny Williams called the 2012 season a "rebuilding" year. In doing so, the Sox made some big moves in the offseason by trading away or letting big name free agents leave. Mark Buehrle became a free agent and decided to follow his former manager, Ozzie Guillén, and sign with the Miami Marlins. The White Sox closer during the 2011 season, Sergio Santos, was traded to the Toronto Blue Jays. Left fielder Juan Pierre became a free agent and signed with the Philadelphia Phillies. Power hitting right fielder Carlos Quentin, was traded to the San Diego Padres. The White Sox did however sign or acquire young talent, including players like José Quintana, Néstor Molina, Simón Castro, Pedro Hernández, Jhan Mariñez, Héctor Giménez, Damaso Espino, Erik Morrison and Osvaldo Martínez. The White Sox signed former Cub and Indian, Kosuke Fukudome, to be the team's fourth outfielder.

Offseason additions and subtractions

†Player released during 2011 season
*Player spent entire 2011 season in Minor Leagues
**Player was non-roster invitee to Spring training (not on 40-man roster)

2012 Top prospects

* According to Baseball America Top 100 Prospects

* According to 2012 Prospect Watch

* Top 10 White Sox prospects via Baseball America

Transactions
 03/25/12 – OF Greg Golson traded from the Kansas City Royals to the White Sox for cash.
 04/03/12 – Traded OF Christian Marrero to the Atlanta Braves for cash.
 04/06/12 – Signed RHP Kip Wells to a minor league deal. but subsequently agreed to a mutual release on April 16, 2012
 04/10/12 – Acquired INF Jose Castro from the Cincinnati Reds for cash.
 05/17/12 – Eric Stults claimed off waivers by the San Diego Padres.
 05/19/12 – Signed free agent 2B Orlando Hudson.
 06/24/12 – Acquired 3B Kevin Youkilis from the Boston Red Sox for UT Brent Lillibridge and RHP Zach Stewart.
 06/26/12 – Released OF Kosuke Fukudome.
 07/03/12 – Released LHP Will Ohman.
 07/21/12 – Acquired RHP Brett Myers from the Houston Astros and cash for minor league prospects RHP Matthew Heidenreich and LHP Blair Walters.
 07/28/12 – Acquired LHP Francisco Liriano from the Minnesota Twins for Eduardo Escobar and Pedro Hernández.
 08/03/12 – Signed free agent DeWayne Wise to a minor league contract.

Regular season

Season standings

American League Central

American League Wild Card

Record vs. opponents

Detailed records and runs scored/allowed

Season summary

Composite inning summary

Opening Day lineup

Monthly summaries

April
The White Sox started the season with their new manager Robin Ventura. In Ventura's first game managed on April 5, the Sox lost 3-2 at Texas. Ventura didn't have to wait long for his first MLB victory as the next day the Sox won 4-3 thanks to a 9th-inning home run by Alex Ríos. Then the Sox lost their first series of the season by dropping the finale to the Rangers 5-0. They went to Cleveland for a two-game series, but three games was scheduled to play, but one game was postponed due to rain. The Sox swept the Indians there. On April 13, the Sox played their first home game of the season against the Tigers and won that game 5-2 and went on to take two out of three to win their first home series of the season. The Sox hosted the Orioles when they dropped three of four to finish their first homestand with a 3-4 record. Then they embark on their west coast trip for six games, three for each city. The Sox swept the Mariners and lost two of three to the Athletics. On April 21 during the second game of the series in Seattle, Philip Humber threw the 21st perfect game in MLB history with 96 pitches thrown with 9 strikeouts in the 4-0 win. In the final game of the series in Oakland on April 25, Paul Konerko hit milestone home run number 400. The Sox travelled back home to host the Red Sox and dropped their first three of a four-game set. The Sox avoided the sweep by beating the Red Sox 4-1 behind a great performance by Gavin Floyd. Konerko had a great first month of the season as he batted .383 with 5 home runs and 15 RBI while winning Player of the Week from April 23 through April 29. The White Sox lost five of their last six games to close out April but finished the month with a record of 11-11 and outscored their opponents 85-82.

May
The White Sox started the month of May losing two of three against the Indians, losing two of three to the Tigers and then lost a doubleheader in Cleveland on May 7. The Sox then came back and won the next two games against Cleveland to split the four games series. The White Sox came home from May 11–15, they lost two of three to the Royals and split a two-games series with the Tigers. Then the White Sox travelled to Los Angeles for a two games series against the Angels. The Sox lost the first game of the series and at that point, through May 16, the White Sox had an overall record of 17-21 and were four and a half games back from the first place Indians. The Sox then beat the Angels in the second game and split the two-game series. The Sox then came back to Chicago for a road series against the Cubs at Wrigley Field for the Crosstown Classic. In the first game of the series, Paul Konerko hit a home run in his first at bat off of Jeff Samardzija. The next time Konerko came up, Samardzija hit Konerko in the face with a pitch and knocked him out for the rest of the series. Samardzija stated that it was not intentional and a breaking ball just got away from him. A few innings later, Sox pitcher Philip Humber threw a pitch behind the Cubs first baseman Bryan LaHair. Both teams were warned and no other problems came about during the series. The Sox went on the sweep the Cubs winning 2-1, 7-4 and 6-0. It was the third time the White Sox had sweep the Cubs and the second time they did it at Wrigley Field. The Sox then lost the first game of a three games series against the Twins. The Sox took the next two games against the Twins to win the series. The Sox then swept the Indians at home by the scores of 9-3, 14-7 and 12-6. The Sox then traveled to Tampa Bay to face the Rays for three games. On May 28, in the first game of that series, the Sox won 2-1 as Chris Sale struck out 15 Rays which tied him with Eddie Cicotte, Ed Walsh and Jim Scott for second most strikeouts in a single game in franchise history. Jack Harshman holds the team record with 16 strikeouts in a single game. The Sox swept the Rays and finished the month on an 8-game winning streak and won 12 of their last 13 games to finish the month of May. The White Sox went from four and a half games back on May 17 to first place and a game and a half over the Indians by the end of the month. The Sox finished the month with a good record of 18-11 and outscored their opponents 156-122.

June
The Sox started the month winning two of three against the Mariners and then losing two of three against the Blue Jays. The White Sox then went into their interleague play part of the season. The Sox started interleague play by facing the Astros. The Astros won the first and third game to win the series. The Sox then traveled to St. Louis to face the defending World Series Champion Cardinals where the Sox won the first game of the series and then lost the next two. The White Sox then traveled to Los Angeles to take on the Dodgers. At the time the Sox played Los Angeles, the Dodgers had the best record in baseball at 40-24. The Sox managed only one win during the three-game series and the Sox went back home after a 2-4 road trip. The Sox then faced their Crosstown rivals for the second time this season. The White Sox lost the first two games to the Cubs but avoided a sweep by winning the final game of the series, 7-0. The Sox then fell out of first place for the first time since May 28. The Sox wrapped up interleague play by winning two of three against the Brewers to finish the interleague season at 9-9. On June 24, during the final game against the Brewers, the White Sox acquired Kevin Youkilis and cash from the Red Sox for Brent Lillibridge and Zach Stewart. The White Sox then finished the month on the road winning two of three against the Twins and winning two of three against the Yankees. A rare occurrence happened during the second game against the Yankees. Going into the top of the ninth inning, the White Sox led the Yankees 10-7. The Yankees had Cory Wade on the mound for the third inning in a row. He had already given up two runs in the seventh and then gave up four more in the 9th while only recording one out. Yankees manager, Joe Girardi, decided to let outfielder DeWayne Wise pitch because the teams bullpen had been so over used the past few days. Wise had not pitched since his sophomore year of high school. Wise is well known by White Sox fans by making "The Catch" that preserved Mark Buehrle's perfect game in 2009. Wise then went on to retire Paul Konerko on a fly ball to center field and got Alex Ríos to ground out to finish out the 9th. The Sox finished the month of June with a record of 13-14, but outscored their opponents 124-116.

July
The White Sox started the month losing the final game of a four-game series against the Yankees. The Sox then swept the two-time defending American League Champion Rangers and took two of three against the Blue Jays. In the opener of the series against the Rangers, the Sox scored a season high 19 runs. The Sox then went into the All-Star break with a three-game lead over the Indians. They were well represented at the All-Star Game with four players making the squad (Adam Dunn, Paul Konerko, Jake Peavy and Chris Sale). The Sox then came out of the break taking two of three against the Royals. The Sox then hit a rough patch which saw them lose 6 of their next 7 games. They lost three of four against the Red Sox and then were swept in Detroit by the Tigers. On July 21, the Sox acquired RHP Brett Myers from the Houston Astros and cash for minor league prospects RHP Matthew Heidenreich and LHP Blair Walters. Also on the same date, the Sox fell out of first place for the first time since June 23. After sweeping the Twins at home, the Sox took the division lead back from the Tigers. On July 28, the Sox acquired LHP Francisco Liriano from the Minnesota Twins for Eduardo Escobar and Pedro Hernández. The Sox took two of three in Texas and then finished the month splitting two games in Minnesota. On July 31, the Sox stated that John Danks would have season ending surgery on his shoulder. The White Sox finished the month with a record of 14-11 (8-1 at home) and outscored their opponents 124-108.

August
On August 3, the Sox brought back DeWayne Wise, who was released from the Yankees on July 30. The Sox started August by beating the Twins 3-2 to secure their series win in Minnesota. Then the Sox had a nine-game homestand as they hosted the Angels, Royals, and the eventual AL West Champion A's. The Sox took two out of three from the Angels, two games went into extras where each club won one. The Sox lost two of three from the Royals and bounced back to win two of three from Athletics. The Sox lost the first game of the series in Toronto via walk-off in extras, and then the Sox went on to win last three in a row to finish the series winning three of four. That was the first series win in Toronto since 2006. The Sox went to KC where they were swept in a three-game set, but not without a historical moment. During the second game of the series on August 18, Adam Dunn hit his 400th career home run. With Konerko also hitting his milestone number 400 back in April, they became the first pair of teammates to hit 400th home runs in the same season in MLB history. The Sox came back home to face the eventual AL East Champion Yankees for three games and the eventual last place finish in AL West Mariners for three games. The Sox swept the mighty Yankees and Mariners to secure their perfect 6-0 homestand. In the opener of the series against the Mariners, the Sox were up five runs going to the ninth inning only to give up six runs to blow that comfortable lead. Then in the home half of the ninth inning, the Sox scored two runs to take the lead back and win it on a walk-off single by Paul Konerko that center fielder Michael Saunders missed the flyball against the wall. The Sox traveled to their tough seven-game road trip to Baltimore and Detroit that stretches into September. Not surprisingly, the Sox lost three out of four in Baltimore and lost the first game in Detroit to close out the month with a respectable record of 16-12 and outscored their opponents 128-118.

September/October
The Sox opened September by losing final two games of the series in Detroit. They were swept in Detroit for the second consecutive time. The Sox hosted the ten-game homestand that was actually reduced to nine because of a rainout. The Sox took two of three from Minnesota but in the only loss of that series, Sox pitching allowed a season high 18 runs. Also in that game, DeWayne Wise pitched for the second time in his career as he pitched a scoreless ninth, he induced a double play and a flyout. The Sox proceeded to host three games to Kansas City when they dropped two of three including one in the extras. The Sox won the opener of the series against Detroit 6–1 thanks to the performance by José Quintana. The Sox went on to lose two in a row against Detroit. The Sox supposed to play one more game to complete the four-game set but it was rained out and made up on a day that was supposed to be an off day for both clubs. It was scheduled for Chris Sale to battle Justin Verlander if not for a rainout but instead it was Quintana versus Doug Fister for a makeup game. Before the make up game after the rainout, the Sox swept the Twins in Minnesota. In the fifth inning of that makeup game, Sox trailed 4–3, Dayán Viciedo grounded into what would otherwise have been a routine double play to end the inning, but Detroit second baseman Omar Infante threw away past first baseman Prince Fielder and two runs scored. The Sox went on to win the makeup game 5–4 after neither clubs scored runs after that play. They went right back on the road trip after just one game at home. They traveled down to Kansas City where they won the first game and lost the last two and went west to L.A. where they were swept by Angels. They went back home to play for seven games, three against the Indians and four against the Rays. They won the opener of the series against the Tribe and then lost the last two to close out that series. After the loss of that finale game, the Sox were not in first place for the first time since July 23. The Sox went on to lose three of four to the red-hot Rays. The playoff hopes for Sox had been diminishing fast as they lost 10 out of their last 12 games, dropping their elimination number to just one as they enter the 10th month of the year. It is now a must situation when the Sox must sweep the Indians and Tigers must get swept in Kansas City, both clubs were playing the final three games of the season. In the opener of the series in Cleveland, the Sox won 11-0, but Tigers also won 6-3, thus eliminating Sox from going to the playoffs. Anyway, the Sox dropped the second game of the series 4–3 on a walk-off single by Jason Donald in the 12th inning. The Sox won the final game of the season by beating the Indians 9–0. The Sox finished September/October with a 13–18 record, but they still outscored their opponents 130–128. They finished 2012 campaign at 85–77, three games back of the Detroit Tigers. The Sox spent 126 days in first place.

Game log

|- align="center" bgcolor="#ffbbbb"
| 1 || April 6 || @ Rangers || 2–3 || Lewis (1–0) || Danks (0–1) || Nathan (1) || 49,085 || 2:24 || 0–1 || −1 || box
|- align="center" bgcolor="#bbffbb"
| 2 || April 7 || @ Rangers || 4–3 || Thornton (1–0) || Nathan (0–1) || Santiago (1) || 47,867 || 2:36 || 1–1 || −1 || box
|- align="center" bgcolor="#ffbbbb"
| 3 || April 8 || @ Rangers || 0–5 || Matt Harrison (1–0) || Floyd (0–1) || || 45,368 || 2:50 || 1–2 || −2 || box
|- align="center" bgcolor="#bbffbb"
| 4 || April 9 || @ Indians || 4–2 || Sale (1–0) || Tomlin (0–1) || Santiago (2) || 9,473 || 2:42 || 2–2 || −1½ || box
|- align="center" bgcolor="#bbbbbb"
| − || April 10 || @ Indians ||colspan=7| Postponed (rain); rescheduled May 7 (game 1) || −2 ||
|- align="center" bgcolor="#bbffbb"
| 5 || April 11 || @ Indians || 10–6 || Danks (1–1) || Masterson (0–1) || || 9,072 || 3:04 || 3–2 || −1 || box
|- align="center" bgcolor="#bbffbb"
| 6 || April 13 || Tigers || 5–2 || Peavy (1–0) || Scherzer (0–1) || Santiago (3) || 38,676 || 2:55 || 4–2 || −½ || box
|- align="center" bgcolor="#bbffbb"
| 7 || April 14 || Tigers || 5–1 || Floyd (1–1) || Wilk (0–1) || || 33,025 || 2:44 || 5–2 || +½ || box  
|- align="center" bgcolor="#ffbbbb"
| 8 || April 15 || Tigers || 2–5 || Porcello (1–0) || Sale (1–1) || || 25,143 || 3:06 || 5–3 || −½ || box 
|- align="center" bgcolor="#ffbbbb"
| 9 || April 16 || Orioles || 4–10 (10) || Strop (1–1) || Stewart (0–1) || || 13,732 || 3:32 || 5–4 || −1½ || box
|- align="center" bgcolor="#ffbbbb"
| 10 || April 17 || Orioles || 2–3 || Chen (1–0) || Danks (1–2) || Johnson (5) || 11,267 || 2:44 || 5–5 || −2½ || box
|- align="center" bgcolor="#bbffbb"
| 11 || April 18 || Orioles || 8–1 || Peavy (2–0) || Hunter (1–1) || || 13,818 || 2:37 || 6–5 || −2½ || box
|- align="center" bgcolor="#ffbbbb"
| 12 || April 19 || Orioles || 3–5 || Hammel (2–0) || Floyd (1–2) || Johnson (6) || 11,836 || 3:08 || 6–6 || −2½ || box
|- align="center" bgcolor="#bbffbb"
| 13 || April 20 || @ Mariners || 7–3 || Sale (2–1) || Noesí (1–2) || || 19,947 || 2:45 || 7–6 || −2 || box  
|- align="center" bgcolor="#bbffbb"
| 14 || April 21 || @ Mariners || 4–0 || Humber (1–0) || Beavan (1–2) || ||  22,472 || 2:17 || 8–6 || −1½ || box
|- align="center" bgcolor="#bbffbb"
| 15 || April 22 || @ Mariners || 7–4 || Danks (2–2) || Millwood (0–1) || Santiago (4) || 19,975 || 2:56 || 9–6 || −½ || box 
|- align="center" bgcolor="#bbffbb"
| 16 || April 23 || @ Athletics || 4–0 || Peavy (3–0) || Colón (3–2) || || 10,574 || 2:23 || 10–6 || 0 || box
|- align="center" bgcolor="#ffbbbb"
| 17 || April 24 || @ Athletics || 0–2 || Milone (3–1) || Floyd (1–3) || Balfour (5) || 11,184 || 2:27 || 10–7 || 0 || box
|- align="center" bgcolor="#ffbbbb"
| 18 || April 25 || @ Athletics || 4–5 (14) || Miller (1–0) || Santiago (0–1) || || 13,032 || 3:56 || 10–8 || 0 || box 
|- align="center" bgcolor="#ffbbbb"
| 19 || April 26 || Red Sox || 3–10 || Doubront (1–0) || Humber (1–1) || Tazawa (1) || 20,266 || 3:03 || 10–9 || −½ || box 
|- align="center" bgcolor="#ffbbbb"
| 20 || April 27 || Red Sox || 3–10 || Bard (2–2) || Danks (2–3) || || 20,414 || 2:47 || 10–10 || −1 || box  
|- align="center" bgcolor="#ffbbbb"
| 21 || April 28 || Red Sox || 0–1 || Lester (1–2) || Peavy (3–1) || Aceves (5) || 20,057 || 2:44 || 10–11 || −1 || box 
|- align="center" bgcolor="#bbffbb"
| 22 || April 29 || Red Sox || 4–1 || Floyd (2–3) || Beckett (2–3) || Thornton (1) || 22,811 || 2:58 || 11–11 || −1 || box
|-

|- align="center" bgcolor="#bbffbb"
| 23 || May 1 || Indians || 7–2 || Sale (3–1) || Jiménez (2–2) || || 15,212 || 2:41 || 12–11 || 0 || box
|- align="center" bgcolor="#ffbbbb"
| 24 || May 2 || Indians || 3–6 || Smith (1–0) || Ohman (0–1) || Perez (8) || 15,192 || 2:46 || 12–12 || −1 || box
|- align="center" bgcolor="#ffbbbb"
| 25 || May 3 || Indians || 5–7 || Masterson (1–2) || Danks (2–4) || Perez (9) || 17,314 || 2:40 || 12–13 || −2 || box
|- align="center" bgcolor="#ffbbbb"
| 26 || May 4 || @ Tigers || 4–5 || Valverde (2–0) || Thornton (1–1) || || 33,615 || 2:49 || 12–14 || −3 || box
|- align="center" bgcolor="#bbffbb"
| 27 || May 5 || @ Tigers || 3–2 || Jones (1–0) || Valverde (2–1) || Reed (1) || 42,404 || 2:47 || 13–14 || −2 || box
|- align="center" bgcolor="#ffbbbb"
| 28 || May 6 || @ Tigers || 1–3 || Porcello (3–2) || Axelrod (0–1) || Valverde (5) || 39,558 || 3:10 || 13–15 || −3 || box
|- align="center" bgcolor="#ffbbbb"
| 29 || May 7 || @ Indians || 6–8 || McAllister (1–0) || Humber (1–2) || Hagadone (1) || 9,196 || 2:50 || 13–16 || −4 || box
|- align="center" bgcolor="#ffbbbb"
| 30 || May 7 || @ Indians || 2–3 || Smith (2–1) || Thornton (1–2) || Sipp (1) || 10,483 || 2:36 || 13–17 || −5 || box
|- align="center" bgcolor="#bbffbb"
| 31 || May 8 || @ Indians || 5–3 (10) || Santiago (1–1) || Perez (0–1) || Reed (2) || 11,304 || 3:03 || 14–17 || −4 || box
|- align="center" bgcolor="#bbffbb"
| 32 || May 9 || @ Indians || 8–1 || Peavy (4–1) || Gómez (2–2) || || 11,285 || 2:33 || 15–17 || −3 || box
|- align="center" bgcolor="#bbffbb"
| 33 || May 11 || Royals || 5–0 || Floyd (3–3) || Paulino (1–1) || || 19,129 || 2:43 || 16–17 || −2½ || box
|- align="center" bgcolor="#ffbbbb"
| 34 || May 12 || Royals || 0–5 || Hochevar (3–3) || Sale (3–2) || || 20,066 || 2:46 || 16–18 || −2½ || box 
|- align="center" bgcolor="#ffbbbb"
| 35 || May 13 || Royals || 1–9 || Mendoza (2–2) || Thornton (1–3) || || 22,636 || 3:21 || 16–19 || −2½ || box
|- align="center" bgcolor="#bbffbb"
| 36 || May 14 || Tigers || 7–5 || Stewart (1–1) || Putkonen (0–2) || Reed (3) || 23,538 || 3:01 || 17–19 || −2½ || box 
|- align="center" bgcolor="#ffbbbb"
| 37 || May 15 || Tigers || 8–10 || Balester (2–0) || Ohman (0–2) || Dotel (1) || 21,473 || 3:42 || 17–20 || −3½ || box  
|- align="center" bgcolor="#ffbbbb"
| 38 || May 16 || @ Angels || 2–7 || Williams (4–1) || Floyd (3–4) || || 39,027 || 2:25 || 17–21 || −4½ || box
|- align="center" bgcolor="#bbffbb"
| 39 || May 17 || @ Angels || 6–1 || Sale (4–2) || Wilson (4–4) || || 30,786 || 3:10 || 18–21 || −4½ || box
|- align="center" bgcolor="#bbffbb"
| 40 || May 18 || @ Cubs || 3–2 || Thornton (2–3) || Samardzija (4–2) || Reed (4) || 34,937 || 2:34 || 19–21 || −3½ || box
|- align="center" bgcolor="#bbffbb"
| 41 || May 19 || @ Cubs || 7–4 || Danks (3–4) || Dempster (0–2) || || 40,228 || 2:51 || 20–21 || −3½ || box
|- align="center" bgcolor="#bbffbb"
| 42 || May 20 || @ Cubs || 6–0 || Peavy (5–1) || Maholm (4–3) || || 38,374 || 2:57 || 21–21 || −2½ || box
|- align="center" bgcolor="#ffbbbb"
| 43 || May 22 || Twins || 2–9 || Walters (2–1) || Floyd (3–5) || || 20,026 || 2:23 || 21–22 || −3½ || box
|- align="center" bgcolor="#bbffbb"
| 44 || May 23 || Twins || 6–0 || Sale (5–2) || Diamond (3–1) || || 20,064 || 2:28 || 22–22 || −3½ || box
|- align="center" bgcolor="#bbffbb"
| 45 || May 24 || Twins || 11–8 || Jones (2–0) || De Vries (0–1) || || 20,167 || 3:13 || 23–22 || −3½ || box
|- align="center" bgcolor="#bbffbb"
| 46 || May 25 || Indians || 9–3 || Quintana (1–0) || Gómez (3–3) || || 21,371 || 3:02 || 24–22 || −2½ || box
|- align="center" bgcolor="#bbffbb"
| 47 || May 26 || Indians || 14–7 || Peavy (6–1) || Lowe (6–3) || || 27,151 || 2:39 || 25–22 || −1½ || box
|- align="center" bgcolor="#bbffbb"
| 48 || May 27 || Indians || 12–6 || Floyd (4–5) || Jiménez (5–4) || || 22,182 || 3:13 || 26–22 || −½ || box
|- align="center" bgcolor="#bbffbb"
| 49 || May 28 || @ Rays || 2–1 || Sale (6–2) || Moore (1–5) || Reed (5) || 22,227 || 2:34 || 27–22 || −½ || box
|- align="center" bgcolor="#bbffbb"
| 50 || May 29 || @ Rays || 7–2 || Humber (2–2) || Shields (6–3) || || 13,735 || 2:45 || 28–22 || +½ || box
|- align="center" bgcolor="#bbffbb"
| 51 || May 30 || @ Rays || 4–3 || Jones (3–0) || Cobb (2–1) || Reed (6) || 13,369 || 2:58 || 29–22 || +1½ || box
|-

|- |- align="center" bgcolor="#bbffbb"
| 52 || June 1 || Mariners || 7–4 || Crain (1–0) || Kelley (0–2) || Reed (7) || 19,168 || 2:48 || 30–22 || +1½ || box
|- align="center" bgcolor="#ffbbbb"
| 53 || June 2 || Mariners || 8–10 (12) || Wilhelmsen (2–1) || Reed (0–1) || Iwakuma (2) || 26,200 || 4:16 || 30–23 || +1½ || box
|- align="center" bgcolor="#bbffbb"
| 54 || June 3 || Mariners || 4–2 || Sale (7–2) || Millwood (3–5) || || 23,062 || 2:45 || 31–23 || +2½ || box
|- align="center" bgcolor="#ffbbbb"
| 55 || June 5 || Blue Jays || 5–9 || Romero (7–1) || Humber (2–3) || || 23,107 || 2:44 || 31–24 || +1½ || box
|- align="center" bgcolor="#ffbbbb"
| 56 || June 6 || Blue Jays || 0–4 || Morrow (7–3) || Quintana (1–1) || || 25,672 || 2:50 || 31–25 || +½ || box
|- align="center" bgcolor="#bbffbb"
| 57 || June 7 || Blue Jays || 4–3 || Reed (1–1) || Cordero (1–3) || || 25,743 || 2:50 || 32–25 || +1½ || box
|- align="center" bgcolor="#ffbbbb"
| 58 || June 8 || Astros || 3–8 || Rodríguez (5–4) || Floyd (4–6) || || 22,452 || 3:09 || 32–26 || +½ || box
|- align="center" bgcolor="#bbffbb"
| 59 || June 9 || Astros || 10–1 || Sale (8–2) || Lyles (1–2) || || 22,880 || 2:44 || 33–26 || +1½ || box
|- align="center" bgcolor="#ffbbbb"
| 60 || June 10 || Astros || 9–11 || Harrell (6–4) || Humber (2–4) || Myers (15) || 20,398 || 3:01 || 33–27 || +½ || box
|- align="center" bgcolor="#bbffbb"
| 61 || June 12 || @ Cardinals || 6–1 || Quintana (2–1) || Wainwright (5–7) || || 40,972 || 2:40 || 34–27 || +1½ || box
|- align="center" bgcolor="#ffbbbb"
| 62 || June 13 || @ Cardinals || 0–1 || Lynn (10–2) || Peavy (6–2) || Motte (12) || 40,045 || 2:24 || 34–28 || +1½ || box
|- align="center" bgcolor="#ffbbbb"
| 63 || June 14 || @ Cardinals || 3–5 || Westbrook (5–6) || Floyd (4–7) || Motte (13) || 43,464 || 2:35 || 34–29 || +1½ || box
|- align="center" bgcolor="#ffbbbb"
| 64 || June 15 || @ Dodgers || 6–7 || Belisario (2–0) || Thornton (2–4) || Jansen (11) || 40,432 || 3:00 || 34–30 || +½ || box
|- align="center" bgcolor="#bbffbb"
| 65 || June 16 || @ Dodgers || 5–4 || Humber (3–4) || Billingsley (4–5) || Reed (8) || 45,210 || 3:14 || 35–30 || +1½ || box
|- align="center" bgcolor="#ffbbbb"
| 66 || June 17 || @ Dodgers || 1–2 || Belisario (3–0) || Thornton (2–5) || || 53,504 || 2:54 || 35–31 || +1½ || box
|- align="center" bgcolor="#ffbbbb"
| 67 || June 18 || Cubs || 3–12 || Garza (3–5) || Stewart (1–2) || || 33,215 || 2:49 || 35–32 || +½ || box
|- align="center" bgcolor="#ffbbbb"
| 68 || June 19 || Cubs || 1–2 || Wood (1–3) || Peavy (6–3) || Mármol (4) || 30,282 || 2:41 || 35–33 || −½ || box
|- align="center" bgcolor="#bbffbb"
| 69 || June 20 || Cubs || 7–0 || Floyd (5–7) || Wells (1–2) || || 32,311 || 2:43 || 36–33 || −½ || box
|- align="center" bgcolor="#ffbbbb" 
| 70 || June 22 || Brewers || 0–1 (10) || Greinke (8–2) || Crain (1–1) || Axford (13) || 22,798 || 2:22 || 36–34 || −1½ || box
|- align="center" bgcolor="#bbffbb"
| 71 || June 23 || Brewers || 8–6 || Crain (2–1) || Veras (3–3) || Reed (9) || 30,337 || 3:31 || 37–34 || −½ || box
|- align="center" bgcolor="#bbffbb"
| 72 || June 24 || Brewers || 1–0 (10) || Bruney (1–0) || Parra (0–2) || || 26,545 || 3:15 || 38–34 || +½ || box
|- align="center" bgcolor="#ffbbbb"
| 73 || June 25 || @ Twins || 1–4 || Liriano (2–7) || Peavy (6–4) || Burton (2) || 35,659 || 3:01 || 38–35 || +½ || box
|- align="center" bgcolor="#bbffbb"
| 74 || June 26 || @ Twins || 3–2 || Floyd (6–7) || Hendriks (0–5) || Reed (10) || 35,102 || 2:41 || 39–35 || +1½ || box
|- align="center" bgcolor="#bbffbb"
| 75 || June 27 || @ Twins || 12–5 || Sale (9–2) || Blackburn (4–5) || || 36,539 || 2:48 || 40–35 || +2½ || box
|- align="center" bgcolor="#bbffbb"
| 76 || June 28 || @ Yankees || 4–3 || Santiago (2–1) || Robertson (0–2) || Reed (11) || 44,041 || 2:54 || 41–35 || +2½ || box
|- align="center" bgcolor="#bbffbb"
| 77 || June 29 || @ Yankees || 14–7 || Quintana (3–1) || Phelps (1–3) || || 44,265 || 3:24 || 42–35 || +3½ || box
|- align="center" bgcolor="#ffbbbb"
| 78 || June 30 || @ Yankees || 0–4 || Kuroda (8–7) || Peavy (6–5) || || 46,895 || 2:25 || 42–36 || +2½ || box
|-

|- align="center" bgcolor="#ffbbbb"
| 79 || July 1 || @ Yankees || 2–4 || Hughes (9–6) || Floyd (6–8) || Soriano (18) || 48,324 || 2:48 || 42–37 || +1½ || box
|- align="center" bgcolor="#bbffbb"
| 80 || July 3 || Rangers || 19–2 || Sale (10–2) || Oswalt (2–1) || || 30,183 || 2:58 || 43–37 || +2 || box
|- align="center" bgcolor="#bbffbb"
| 81 || July 4 || Rangers || 5–4 (10) || Reed (2–1) || Adams (1–3) || || 30,271 || 3:22 || 44–37 || +2 || box
|- align="center" bgcolor="#bbffbb"
| 82 || July 5 || Rangers || 2–1 || Quintana (4–1) || Harrison (11–4) || Reed (12) || 21,288 || 2:09 || 45–37 || +2 || box
|- align="center" bgcolor="#bbffbb"
| 83 || July 6 || Blue Jays || 4–2 || Peavy (7–5) || Laffey (0–1) || Reed (13) || 27,129 || 2:31 || 46–37 || +3 || box
|- align="center" bgcolor="#bbffbb"
| 84 || July 7 || Blue Jays || 2–0 || Floyd (7–8) || Romero (8–4) || Thornton (2) || 25,399 || 2:25 || 47–37 || +3 || box
|- align="center" bgcolor="#ffbbbb"
| 85 || July 8 || Blue Jays || 9–11 || Frasor (1–1) || Axelrod (0–2) || Janssen (12) || 27,190 || 3:48 || 47–38 || +3 || box
|- align="center" bgcolor="bbcaff"
|colspan="3" bgcolor="#bbcaff"| July 10: All-Star Game (NL Wins) || 0–8 || Cain || Verlander || || 40,933 || 2:59 || colspan=3 | box
|- align="center" bgcolor="#bbffbb"
| 86 || July 13 || @ Royals || 9–8 (14) || Axelrod (1–2) || Teaford (1–3) || || 32,744 || 5:23 || 48–38 || +3 || box
|- align="center" bgcolor="#ffbbbb"
| 87 || July 14 || @ Royals || 3–6 || Hochevar (7–8) || Peavy (7–6) || Broxton (22) || 24,998 || 2:56 || 48–39 || +3 || box
|- align="center" bgcolor="#bbffbb"
| 88 || July 15 || @ Royals || 2–1 || Sale (11–2) || Mendoza (3–6) || Reed (14) || 25,714 || 2:52 || 49–39 || +3½ || box
|- align="center" bgcolor="#ffbbbb"
| 89 || July 16 || @ Red Sox || 1–5 || Padilla (3–0) || Séptimo (0–1) || || 38,334 || 2:40 || 49–40 || +2½ || box
|- align="center" bgcolor="#bbffbb"
| 90 || July 17 || @ Red Sox || 7–5 || Humber (4–4) || Lester (5–7) || Reed (15) || 37,771 || 3:06 || 50–40 || +3½ || box
|- align="center" bgcolor="#ffbbbb"
| 91 || July 18 || @ Red Sox || 1–10 || Doubront (10–4) || Hernández (0–1) || || 37,367 || 2:50 || 50–41 || +2½ || box
|- align="center" bgcolor="#ffbbbb"
| 92 || July 19 || @ Red Sox || 1–3 || Aceves (1–6) || Thornton (2–6) || || 38,413 || 2:47 || 50–42 || +1½ || box
|- align="center" bgcolor="#ffbbbb"
| 93 || July 20 || @ Tigers || 2–4 || Verlander (11–5) || Peavy (7–7) || Valverde (18) || 44,572 || 2:47 || 50–43 || +½ || box
|- align="center" bgcolor="#ffbbbb"
| 94 || July 21 || @ Tigers || 1–7 || Porcello (7–5) || Sale (11–3) || || 42,888 || 2:11 || 50–44 || −½ || box
|- align="center" bgcolor="#ffbbbb"
| 95 || July 22 || @ Tigers || 4–6 || Turner (1–1) || Humber (4–5) || Benoit (2) || 41,281 || 3:00 || 50–45 || −1½ || box
|- align="center" bgcolor="#bbffbb"
| 96 || July 23 || Twins || 7–4 || Floyd (8–8) || Liriano (3–10) || Reed (16) || 37,788 || 2:48 || 51–45 || −1 || box
|- align="center" bgcolor="#bbffbb"
| 97 || July 24 || Twins || 11–4 || Jones (4–0) || Fien (1–1) || || 34,715 || 3:08 || 52–45 || 0 || box
|- align="center" bgcolor="#bbffbb"
| 98 || July 25 || Twins || 8–2 || Peavy (8–7) || Blackburn (4–6) || || 32,261 || 3:09 || 53–45 || 0 || box
|- align="center" bgcolor="#bbffbb"
| 99 || July 27 || @ Rangers || 9–5 || Sale (12–3) || Darvish (11–7) || || 47,638 || 3:31 || 54–45 || +1½ || box
|- align="center" bgcolor="#bbffbb"
| 100 || July 28 || @ Rangers || 5–2 || Humber (5–5) || Harrison (12–6) || || 47,580 || 2:41 || 55–45 || +2½ || box
|- align="center" bgcolor="#ffbbbb"
| 101 || July 29 || @ Rangers || 0–2 || Feldman (5–6) || Floyd (8–9) || Nathan (21) || 46,744 || 2:38 || 55–46 || +1½ || box
|- align="center" bgcolor="#ffbbbb"
| 102 || July 30 || @ Twins || 6–7 || Perkins (2–1) || Myers (0–5) || || 35,018 || 3:08 || 55–47 || +1½ || box
|- align="center" bgcolor="#bbffbb"
| 103 || July 31 || @ Twins || 4–3 || Thornton (3–6) || Gray (5–1) || Reed (17) || 36,424 || 2:41 || 56–47 || +2½ || box
|-

|- align="center" bgcolor="#bbffbb"
| 104 || August 1 || @ Twins || 3–2 || Peavy (9–7) || Diamond (9–5) || Reed (18) || 34,823 || 2:49 || 57–47 || +2½ || box
|- align="center" bgcolor="#bbffbb"
| 105 || August 3 || Angels || 8–6 (10) || Thornton (4–6) || Takahashi (0–3) || || 32,060 || 3:35 || 58–47 || +2½ || box
|- align="center" bgcolor="#ffbbbb"
| 106 || August 4 || Angels || 5–6 (10) || Jepsen (2–1) || Thornton (4–7) || Frieri (13) || 28,571 || 3:26 || 58–48 || +1½ || box
|- align="center" bgcolor="#bbffbb"
| 107 || August 5 || Angels || 4–2 || Jones (5–0) || Isringhausen (3–2) || Reed (19) || 30,202 || 2:58 || 59–48 || +1½ || box
|- align="center" bgcolor="#bbffbb"
| 108 || August 6 || Royals || 4–2 || Sale (13–3) || Mendoza (5–8) || Reed (20) || 30,097 || 2:17 || 60–48 || +1½ || box
|- align="center" bgcolor="#ffbbbb" 
| 109 || August 7 || Royals || 2–5 || Chen (8–9) || Peavy (9–8) || Holland (2) || 27,194 || 2:34 || 60–49 || +½ || box
|- align="center" bgcolor="#ffbbbb"
| 110 || August 8 || Royals || 1–2 || Guthrie (4–12) || Quintana (4–2) || Holland (3) || 25,151 || 2:37 || 60–50 || +½ || box
|- align="center" bgcolor="#bbffbb" 
| 111 || August 10 || Athletics || 4–3 || Myers (1–5) || Neshek (1–1) || || 25,041 || 2:53 || 61–50 || +1 || box
|- align="center" bgcolor="#ffbbbb" 
| 112 || August 11 || Athletics || 7–9 || Cook (5–2) || Thornton (4–8) || Balfour (8) || 26,686 || 3:38 || 61–51 || +1 || box
|- align="center" bgcolor="#bbffbb"  
| 113 || August 12 || Athletics || 7–3 || Sale (14–3) || Colón (9–9) || || 25,106 || 2:53 || 62–51 || +2 || box
|- align="center" bgcolor="#ffbbbb"
| 114 || August 13 || @ Blue Jays || 2–3 (11) || Delabar (3–1) || Séptimo (0–2) || || 16,828 || 3:05 || 62–52 || +2 || box
|- align="center" bgcolor="#bbffbb"
| 115 || August 14 || @ Blue Jays || 3–2 || Quintana (5–2) || Álvarez (7–10) || Reed (21) || 18,919 || 2:31 || 63–52 || +2 || box
|- align="center" bgcolor="#bbffbb"
| 116 || August 15 || @ Blue Jays || 9–5 || Floyd (9–9) || Romero (8–10) || || 20,119 || 2:39 || 64–52 || +2 || box
|- align="center" bgcolor="#bbffbb" 
| 117 || August 16 || @ Blue Jays || 7–2 || Liriano (4–10) || Laffey (3–4) || || 19,855 || 2:34 || 65–52 || +2½ || box
|- align="center" bgcolor="#ffbbbb" 
| 118 || August 17 || @ Royals || 2–4 || Mendoza (7–8) || Sale (14–4) || Holland (5) || 22,169 || 2:31 || 65–53 || +1½ || box
|- align="center" bgcolor="#ffbbbb"
| 119 || August 18 || @ Royals || 4–9 || Chen (9–10) || Peavy (9–9) || || 23,858 || 2:59 || 65–54 || +1½ || box
|- align="center" bgcolor="#ffbbbb"
| 120 || August 19 || @ Royals || 2–5 || Holland (6–3) || Crain (2–2) || || 22,401 || 2:43 || 65–55 || +1½ || box
|- align="center" bgcolor="#bbffbb"
| 121 || August 20 || Yankees || 9–6 || Myers (2–5) || Logan (4–2) || Reed (22) || 27,561 || 3:44 || 66–55 || +2 || box
|- align="center" bgcolor="#bbffbb"
| 122 || August 21 || Yankees || 7–3 || Liriano (5–10) || Nova (11–7) || || 24,247 || 2:37 || 67–55 || +2 || box
|- align="center" bgcolor="#bbffbb"
| 123 || August 22 || Yankees || 2–1 || Sale (15–4) || Hughes (12–11) || Reed (23) || 26,319 || 2:27 || 68–55 || +2 || box 
|- align="center" bgcolor="#bbffbb"
| 124 || August 24 || Mariners || 9–8 || Reed (3–1) || Wilhelmsen (4–3) || || 25,058 || 3:00 || 69–55 || +2½ || box
|- align="center" bgcolor="#bbffbb"
| 125 || August 25 || Mariners || 5–4 || Jones (6–0) || Beavan (8–8) || Reed (24) || 27,562 || 3:15 || 70–55 || +2½ || box
|- align="center" bgcolor="#bbffbb"
| 126 || August 26 || Mariners || 4–3 (7) || Jones (7–0) || Millwood (4–11) || || 23,146 || 2:22 || 71–55 || +2½ || box
|- align="center" bgcolor="#ffbbbb"
| 127 || August 27 || @ Orioles || 3–4 || Strop (5–2) || Myers (2–6) || Johnson (40) || 10,955 || 3:06 || 71–56 || +2 || box
|- align="center" bgcolor="#ffbbbb"
| 128 || August 28 || @ Orioles || 0–6 || Tillman (7–2) || Sale (15–5) || || 12,841 || 2:30 || 71–57 || +2 || box
|- align="center" bgcolor="#bbffbb"
| 129 || August 29 || @ Orioles || 8–1 || Axelrod (2–2) || Saunders (6–11) || || 13,098 || 2:51 || 72–57 || +3 || box
|- align="center" bgcolor="#ffbbbb"
| 130 || August 30 || @ Orioles || 3–5 || Britton (4–1) || Quintana (5–3) || Johnson (41) || 10,141 || 2:31 || 72–58 || +3 || box
|- align="center" bgcolor="#ffbbbb"
| 131 || August 31 || @ Tigers || 4–7 || Dotel (5–2) || Peavy (9–10) || Valverde (27) || 36,721 || 3:10 || 72–59 || +2 || box
|-

|- align="center" bgcolor="#ffbbbb"
| 132 || September 1 || @ Tigers || 1–5 || Scherzer (15–6) || Liriano (5–11) || || 40,059 || 3:17 || 72–60 || +1 || box
|- align="center" bgcolor="#ffbbbb"
| 133 || September 2 || @ Tigers || 2–4 || Verlander (13–7) || Sale (15–6) || Valverde (28) || 42,192 || 2:52 || 72–61 || 0 || box
|- align="center" bgcolor="#bbffbb"
| 134 || September 3 || Twins || 4–2 || Santiago (3–1) || Deduno (5–3) || Reed (25) || 21,676 || 3:00 || 73–61 || +1 || box
|- align="center" bgcolor="#ffbbbb"
| 135 || September 4 || Twins || 9–18 || Diamond (11–6) || Quintana (5–4) || || 15,698 || 3:24 || 73–62 || +1 || box
|- align="center" bgcolor="#bbffbb"
| 136 || September 5 || Twins || 6–2 || Peavy (10–10) || Walters (2–3) || || 17,336 || 2:40 || 74–62 || +1 || box
|- align="center" bgcolor="#ffbbbb"
| 137 || September 7 || Royals || 5–7 || Herrera (2–2) || Reed (3–2) || Holland (12) || 26,660 || 3:02 || 74–63 || +1 || box
|- align="center" bgcolor="#bbffbb"
| 138 || September 8 || Royals || 5–4 || Sale (16–6) || Chen (10–12) || Reed (26) || 26,227 || 2:48 || 75–63 || +2 || box
|- align="center" bgcolor="#ffbbbb"
| 139 || September 9 || Royals || 1–2 (10) || Herrera (3–2) || Myers (2–7) || Holland (13) || 19,356 || 3:30 || 75–64 || +2 || box
|- align="center" bgcolor="#bbffbb"
| 140 || September 10  || Tigers || 6–1 || Quintana (6–4) || Porcello (9–12) || || 30,287 || 2:54 || 76–64 || +3 || box
|- align="center" bgcolor="#ffbbbb"
| 141 || September 11 || Tigers || 3–5 || Fister (9–8) || Peavy (10–11) || Valverde (29) || 26,504 || 3:15 || 76–65 || +2 || box
|- align="center" bgcolor="#ffbbbb"
| 142 || September 12 || Tigers || 6–8 || Scherzer (9–8) || Floyd (9–10) || Valverde (30) || 30,667 || 3:25 || 76–66 || +1 || box
|- bgcolor="#bbbbbb"
| – || September 13 || Tigers ||colspan=7| Postponed (rain); rescheduled September 17 || +1 || 
|- align="center" bgcolor="#bbffbb"
| 143 || September 14 || @ Twins || 6–0 || Sale (17–6) || Vásquez (0–2) || || 30,729 || 2:48 || 77–66 || +1 || box
|- align="center" bgcolor="#bbffbb"
| 144 || September 15 || @ Twins || 5–3 || Liriano (6–11) || Deduno (6–4) || Thornton (3) || 36,308 || 2:39 || 78–66 || +1 || box
|- align="center" bgcolor="#bbffbb"
| 145 || September 16 || @ Twins || 9–2 || Peavy (11–11) || Diamond (11–8) || || 31,722 || 2:55 || 79–66 || +2 || box
|- align="center" bgcolor="#bbffbb"
| 146 || September 17 || Tigers || 5–4 || Jones (8–0) || Fister (9–9) || Reed (27) || 29,130 || 3:07 || 80–66 || +3 || box
|- align="center" bgcolor="#bbffbb"
| 147 || September 18 || @ Royals || 3–2 || Floyd (10–10) || Hochevar (8–14) || Reed (28) || 14,420 || 2:12 || 81–66 || +3 || box
|- align="center" bgcolor="#ffbbbb"
| 148 || September 19 || @ Royals || 0–3 || Chen (11–12) || Sale (17–7) || Holland (14) || 15,120 || 2:51 || 81–67 || +2 || box
|- align="center" bgcolor="#ffbbbb"
| 149 || September 20 || @ Royals || 3–4 || Holland (7–4) || Crain (2–3) || || 14,710 || 2:41 || 81–68 || +2 || box
|- align="center" bgcolor="#ffbbbb"
| 150 || September 21 || @ Angels || 2–6 || Santana (9–12) || Peavy (11–12) || || 39,326 || 2:32 || 81–69 || +1½ || box
|- align="center" bgcolor="#ffbbbb"
| 151 || September 22 || @ Angels || 2–4 || Haren (12–11) || Quintana (6–5) || Frieri (20) || 41,440 || 2:48 || 81–70 || +½ || box
|- align="center" bgcolor="#ffbbbb"
| 152 || September 23 || @ Angels || 1–4 || Weaver (19–4) || Floyd (10–11) || || 36,546 || 2:39 || 81–71 || +1 || box
|- align="center" bgcolor="#bbffbb"
| 153 || September 24 || Indians || 5–4 || Myers (3–7) || Pestano (3–3) || Veal (1) || 20,206 || 2:37 || 82–71 || +1 || box
|- align="center" bgcolor="#ffbbbb"
| 154 || September 25 || Indians || 3–4 || Kluber (2–4) || Liriano (6–12) || Perez (37) || 13,797 || 2:35 || 82–72 || 0 || box
|- align="center" bgcolor="#ffbbbb"
| 155 || September 26 || Indians || 4–6 || Sipp (1–2) || Thornton (4–9) || Perez (38) || 20,166 || 3:44 || 82–73 || −1 || box
|- align="center" bgcolor="#ffbbbb"
| 156 || September 27 || Rays || 2–3 || Peralta (2–6) || Myers (3–8) || Rodney (46) || 18,630 || 3:11 || 82–74 || −2 || box
|- align="center" bgcolor="#bbffbb"
| 157 || September 28 || Rays || 3–1 || Floyd (11–11) || Hellickson (9–11) || Reed (29) || 25,264 || 3:08 || 83–74 || −1 ||  box
|- align="center" bgcolor="#ffbbbb"
| 158 || September 29 || Rays || 4–10 || Moore (11–11) || Sale (17–8) || Archer (1) || 26,559 || 3:19 || 83–75 || −2 ||  box
|- align="center" bgcolor="#ffbbbb"
| 159 || September 30 || Rays || 2–6 || Price (20–5) || Quintana (6–6) || || 26,831 || 3:06 || 83–76 || −3 ||  box
|- align="center" bgcolor="#bbffbb"
| 160 || October 1 || @ Indians || 11–0 || Santiago (4–1) || Kluber (2–5) || || 14,756 || 3:02 || 84–76 || −3 ||  box
|- align="center" bgcolor="#ffbbbb"
| 161 || October 2 || @ Indians || 3–4 (12) || Seddon (1–1) || Thornton (4–10) || || 10,015 || 3:23 || 84–77 || −3 ||  box
|- align="center" bgcolor="#bbffbb"
| 162 || October 3 || @ Indians || 9–0 || Floyd (12–11) || Huff (3–1) || || 18,093 || 2:50 || 85–77 || −3 ||  box
|-

Roster

Player stats
Stats through October 3, 2012

Batting
Note: G = Games played; AB = At bats; R = Runs scored; H = Hits; 2B = Doubles; 3B = Triples; HR = Home runs; RBI = Runs batted in; BB = Base on balls; SO = Strikeouts; AVG = Batting average; SB = Stolen bases

Pitching
Note: W = Wins; L = Losses; ERA = Earned run average; G = Games pitched; GS = Games started; SV = Saves; IP = Innings pitched; H = Hits allowed; R = Runs allowed; ER = Earned runs allowed; HR = Home runs allowed; BB = Walks allowed; K = Strikeouts

Farm system

References

External links
2012 Chicago White Sox season at Baseball Reference

Chicago White Sox seasons
Chicago White Sox
White